Defending champions Alfie Hewett and Gordon Reid defeated Stéphane Houdet and Nicolas Peifer in the final, 6–3, 6–0 to win the men's doubles wheelchair tennis title at the 2021 French Open. It was their second step towards a Grand Slam.

Seeds

Draw

Finals

References

 Draw

Wheelchair Men's Doubles
French Open, 2021 Men's Doubles